121st Street may refer to:
 121st Street (Manhattan), a street in Manhattan, New York, USA
 121st Street (BMT Jamaica Line), a station on the BMT Jamaica Line in Queens, New York, USA
 121st Street (IRT Second Avenue Line), a station on the demolished IRT Second Avenue Line in Manhattan, New York, USA